Ámbar Michell Garnica Flores is a Mexican freestyle wrestler. At the 2019 Pan American Games held in Lima, Peru, she won one of the bronze medals in the 68 kg event.

In 2019, at the World Wrestling Championships held in Nur-Sultan, Kazakhstan, she competed in the 68 kg event where she was eliminated in her first match. In May 2021, she failed to qualify for the Olympics at the World Olympic Qualification Tournament held in Sofia, Bulgaria. In October 2021, she competed in the 68 kg event at the World Wrestling Championships held in Oslo, Norway. She also competed in the 68 kg event at the 2022 World Wrestling Championships held in Belgrade, Serbia.

Achievements

References

External links 
 

Living people
Year of birth missing (living people)
Place of birth missing (living people)
Mexican female sport wrestlers
Pan American Games medalists in wrestling
Pan American Games bronze medalists for Mexico
Wrestlers at the 2019 Pan American Games
Medalists at the 2019 Pan American Games
Pan American Wrestling Championships medalists
21st-century Mexican women